doTerra (styled dōTERRA) is a multi-level marketing company based in Pleasant Grove, Utah that sells essential oils and other related products. doTerra was founded in 2008 by former executives of Young Living and others. The company's products are sold through independent distributors called Wellness Advocates, using a multi-level marketing model to sell its products. Individuals receive commissions based on their own sales and the sales of others in their organization.

The company and its representatives have repeatedly come under fire for misleading claims that their products could help prevent or cure diseases such as cancer, autism, Ebola and more recently, COVID-19, even being the target of a warning from the Food and Drug Administration and the Federal Trade Commission. The assertion that aromatherapy can have curative properties beyond relaxation is not supported by the company.

History

The company was established in April 2008 by David Stirling, Emily Wright, David Hill, Corey B. Lindley, Gregory P. Cook, Robert J. Young, and Mark A. Wolfert. Stirling, Wright, and Hill were former executives of Young Living, a company that also sells essential oils via multi-level marketing. Its name is inspired by the Latin phrase for "gift of the Earth." The company initially launched with 25 single oils and ten oil blends.

In August 2013, Young Living filed suit against doTerra for theft of trade secrets, alleging that the company had re-created their production process illegally. During the lawsuit between the two companies, Young Living produced an analysis of doTerra products that suggested the company was using synthetic chemicals in their "organic" products. Testimony was given that the oils, which were tested by the Centre National de la Recherche Scientifique, did not match any oils sold by doTerra. As of 2013, doTerra reported having about 450 corporate employees, 350 at the Utah headquarters, and 100 at offices in Taiwan, Japan, Europe, and Australia. Later, the company announced that it would build a new headquarters in Pleasant Grove, Utah. In 2014, the company was selling over 150 products such as supplements, personal care items, and essential oils.

In October 2014, the Fourth District Court dismissed the claims made against doTerra; the companies also settled lawsuits regarding faked lab tests, false advertising, and theft of trade secrets and withdrew their negative claims in relation to the purity of each other's products. 

In 2015, the number of "Wellness Advocates" joining the company grew by more than 120 percent. By year-end 2015, the company claimed that it had generated more than $1 billion in sales. In April 2016, doTerra sent letters to distributors advising them that a breach in a system where personal information was stored had occurred in March 2016. Personal information potentially acquired in the breach included: names, dates of birth, social security numbers, addresses, telephone numbers, email addresses, debit and credit card numbers, usernames, and passwords. The company explained that a third-party vendor was at fault. To compensate, the company offered 24 months of credit monitoring through AllClear, a credit monitoring company.

As of 2017, doTerra reported having approximately 1,650 corporate employees and over 3 million Wellness Advocates across 100 countries.

In July 2018, the court ruled that Young Living acted in bad faith and had misled the court, thus the judge ordered Young Living to cover doTerra's attorney costs. In 2021, doTerra recalled 1.3 million bottles of its oils due to the lack of child resistant packaging. In April 2022, doTerra entered into a $5 million agreement with the University of Mississippi to research essential oils.

Distributor claims
On September 22, 2014, the U.S. Food and Drug Administration issued an FDA Warning Letter to doTerra for its distributors marketing products as possible treatments or cures for Ebola, cancer, autism, and other conditions in violation of the Food, Drug and Cosmetic Act. Federal agents conducted an investigation of doTerra's files.

Some distributors have promoted the company's products for air purification and protecting against the health effects of smoke from the California wildfires. It was alleged in 2018 that some distributors had offered personal stories to customers claiming that their child had benefited from essential oils.

In 2020, some doTerra distributors attempted to benefit from public concern regarding COVID-19 by claiming that the company's products have immune boosting properties, despite no scientific evidence to support such claims. The Federal Trade Commission warned the company it must stop making such unfounded health claims and exaggerated earnings by its distributors.

More than a dozen women working for doTerra’s frankincense supplier, a Somaliland company called Asli Maydi, reported poor pay, sexual abuse and unhealthy work conditions. According to the Fuller Project, abuse continued for years after victims contacted doTerra.

Projects

doTerra Healing Hands Foundation
The doTerra Healing Hands Foundation is a 501(c)(3) non-profit organization established by doTerra in 2012. In 2016, the foundation partnered with the non-profit organization Choice Humanitarian to send staff and distributors to Nepal and Guatemala to install vented brick stoves for families.
	
In 2017, the doTerra Healing Hands organization began collecting donations from its distributors in the wake of Hurricane Harvey to cover the costs of providing relief packs containing samples of the company's products to evacuees in Dallas. In October 2017, Pacific Standard reported that after collecting donations, doTerra did not deliver the shipments, allegedly due to weather conditions, and described the incident as "a modern example of malfeasance masquerading as altruism—a type of scam often found in multi-level marketing organizations." In an update to their report in March 2018, Pacific Standard noted that doTerra did eventually send shipments of doTerra hygiene packs to residents in Houston.

Kealakekua Mountain Reserve
In 2018, the company purchased $7.3 million of land in the Kealakekua Mountain Reserve to source its sandalwood on Hawaii's Big Island. doTerra announced a 10-year plan to use dead sandalwood for its essential oil production while keeping 75 percent of the land forested. It built a nursery on the reserve to grow saplings and protect from tree-killing species. doTerra has planted 300,000 native trees and claims it will plant more than 1 million by 2030.

References

External links
 

Multi-level marketing companies based in Utah
Companies based in Utah County, Utah
Direct sales companies established in 2008
2008 establishments in Utah
Personal selling
Autism pseudoscience
American companies established in 2008